Vieira Sport Clube, commonly known as Vieira, is a Portuguese football club based in Vieira do Minho, Braga. Founded in 1965, it currently plays in the third tier Segunda Divisão (North Zone), holding home matches at Municipal de Vieira do Minho, with a capacity of 2,500 seats.

References

External links
Official website 
Zerozero team profile

Vieira
Vieira
1965 establishments in Portugal
Vieira do Minho